NGC 37 is a lenticular galaxy located in the Phoenix constellation. It is approximately 42 kiloparsecs (137,000 light-years) in diameter and about 12.9 billion years old.

It maybe has a companion galaxy called PGC 95382. Its redshift and radial velocity (z=0.03007 & V=8880 km/s) are really similar so it can be situated quite close to NGC 37.

Group membership 
NGC 37 is the member of SCG2 0009-5713, a compact galaxy group. Its other members are PGC 128413, a spiral galaxy, PGC 128414, a lenticular galaxy similar to NGC 37 and PGC 95382. The galaxy group's redshift is probably around 0.031000 because most of its members have a similar value.

References

External links
 
 

Lenticular galaxies
Phoenix (constellation)
0037
801
18361002